Tomoplagia incompleta is a species of tephritid or fruit flies in the genus Tomoplagia of the family Tephritidae.

Distribution
West Indies, Paraguay, Brazil, Argentina.

References

Tephritinae
Insects described in 1896
Diptera of South America